The year 718 BC was a year of the pre-Julian Roman calendar. In the Roman Empire, it was known as year 36 Ab urbe condita . The denomination 718 BC for this year has been used since the early medieval period, when the Anno Domini calendar era became the prevalent method in Europe for naming years.

Events
Gyges becomes the ruler of Lydia.

Births

Deaths

References

710s BC